Kaleh-ye Sefid (also Romanized as Kaleh-ye Sefīd; also known as Kalehsefīd and Kalāteh-ye Sefīd) is a village in Meyghan Rural District, in the Central District of Nehbandan County, South Khorasan Province, Iran. At the 2006 census, its population was 36, in 12 families.

References 

Populated places in Nehbandan County